Cuvânt moldovenesc was a Bessarabian newspaper.

History 

The first edition was printed on January 1, 1914 and last on January 7, 1919. The first editor in chief was Nicolae Alexandri, rempalced on April 2, 1917 by Pan Halippa. Among the authors were: Simion Murafa, Ion Pelivan, Daniel Ciugureanu, M. Ciachir, Gh. Stîrcea, T. Inculeţ. It was written with the Romanian Cyrillic alphabet .

On March 21, 1943, Cuvânt moldovenesc reappeared under the leadership of Leon T. Boga and Iorgu Tudor.

Bibliography 
 Georgeta Răduică, Dicţionarul presei româneşti (1731–1918), Editura Ştiinţifică, București,

External links
  Cuvânt Moldovenesc
  PRESA BASARABEANĂ de la începuturi pînă în anul 1957

Footnotes 

Publications established in 1914
Publications disestablished in 1919
Bessarabia Governorate
Romanian-language newspapers
Newspapers published in Moldova